David Nimmer is an American lawyer, law professor, renowned as an expert in United States copyright law. He received an A.B. with distinction and honors in 1977 from Stanford University and his J.D. in 1980 from Yale Law School, where he served as editor of the Yale Law Journal. David Nimmer is of counsel to Irell & Manella LLP in Los Angeles, California. He also serves as a Professor from Practice at University of California, Los Angeles Law School and Distinguished Scholar at the Berkeley Center for Law and Technology. In 2000, he was elected to the American Law Institute. He has served as a guest professor at the University of Haifa, Yeshiva University (Cardozo Law School), the University of Miami, and Syracuse University.

Nimmer was named the 2010 "Intellectual Property Lawyer of the Year" by the Century City Bar Association. He was selected a Southern California "Super Lawyer" by Los Angeles Magazine in 2006-2010 and has been named in The Best Lawyers in America for over 10 years. The Los Angeles and San Francisco Daily Journals named him one of California's "Top 10 Copyright Lawyers" in 2008. In September 2010, he was named one of "The 25 Most Influential People in IP" in The American Lawyer's Fall 2010 Intellectual Property supplement (in the good company of such fellow honorees as Supreme Court justice Anthony Kennedy, PTO Director David Kappos, and Sen. Patrick Leahy.)

Nimmer also served as the Chairman on the Committee on Intellectual Properties Litigation for the American Bar Association from 1989-1992.

Since 1985, Nimmer has updated and revised Nimmer on Copyright, the standard reference treatise in the field, first published in 1963 by his late father, Professor Melville B. Nimmer. Routinely cited by domestic and foreign courts at all levels in copyright litigation, cases within the United States have relied on Nimmer on Copyright as persuasive authority in over 2500 judicial opinions. 

He has also contributed to numerous other books, including Le lisibile et l’illsibe (2003), Cases and Materials on Copyright and Other Aspects of Entertainment Litigation (2002), Artefacts and Intellectual Property (2001), Copinger and Skone James on Copyright (1991), OnMultimedia: Technologies for the 21st Century (1990), Droit des affaires (1989), and International Copyright Law and Practice (1989–1998). 

He has also composed a series of influential articles. Kluwer Law International collected several dozen into two published anthologies.  One is entitled Copyright Illuminated (2008) and the other is Sacred Text, Technology, and the DMCA (2003).  At present, along with UCLA colleague Prof. Neil Netanel, he is co-authoring a book for Oxford University Press regarding five centuries of rabbinic copyright responsa, entitled From Maimonides to Microsoft.

He has taught copyright at UCLA Law School for many years, as well as representing clients in the entertainment, publishing, and high-technology fields. He has twice gone to Washington D.C. on behalf of clients whose copyright matters were before the Supreme Court. The first occasion resulted in a unanimous decision in favor of his client, which simultaneously drew the boundaries between copyright and trademark protection. The second matter did likewise, in a decision issued in March 2010 that vitally affects all freelance writers in the country and the databases that present their historical works.

Other litigation highlights include successfully representing Matthew Bender & Co. before the Second Circuit Court of Appeals in its quest to unlock West's effective monopoly on presenting judicial opinions; convincing the Federal Circuit Court of Appeals to rebuff an opponent's attempt to have copyright law control manufacture of a universal garage door opener; and winning a case in the Tenth Circuit Court of Appeals
that allowed his client unfettered rights to publish Jesus: A New Revelation. Along the way, other litigated cases have ranged from the status of Winnie-the-Pooh to the collected choreography of Martha Graham to the Google Books settlement in New York City (still pending, for which he represents the interests of Amazon.com).

Nimmer has given congressional testimony on behalf of the United States Telephone Association and the National Association of Broadcasters. In addition, he gave parliamentary testimony in Sydney on behalf of the Combined Newspaper and Magazine Copyright Committee of Australia. He once offered an amicus brief to the Supreme Court of Israel—which took six years to decide the case, in the process declining his offer. He responded by publishing a 223-page article in the Houston Law Review, Copyright in the Dead Sea Scrolls.

References

External links 
 UCLA Faculty page

American lawyers
Stanford University alumni
Yale Law School alumni
UCLA School of Law faculty
Living people
Year of birth missing (living people)